Kóny is a village in Győr-Moson-Sopron county, Hungary. It is around 20 km west of Győr.

External links 
 Street map 

Populated places in Győr-Moson-Sopron County